Ali Qapu Palace (‘Ālī Qāpū) or the Grand Ali Qapu is an imperial palace in Isfahan, Iran. It is located on the western side of the Naqsh-e Jahan Square, opposite to Sheikh Lotfollah Mosque, and had been originally designed as a vast portal entrance to the grand palace which stretched from the Naqsh-e Jahan Square to the Chahar Baq Boulevard. The palace served as the official residence of Persian Emperors of the Safavid dynasty. UNESCO inscribed the Palace and the Square as a World Heritage Site due to its cultural and historical importance. The palace is forty-eight meters high and there are  six floors, each accessible by a difficult spiral staircase. In the sixth floor, Music Hall, deep circular niches are found in the walls, having not only aesthetic value, but also acoustic. Ali Qapu is regarded as the best example of Safavid architecture and a symbol of Iran's Islamic heritage.

The name Ali Qapu, from Persian ‘Ālī (meaning "imperial" or "great"), and Azerbaijani Qāpū (meaning "gate"), was given to this place as it was right at the entrance to the Safavid palaces which stretched from the Naqsh-e Jahan Square to the Chahar Baq Boulevard.
The building, another wonderful Safavid edifice, was built by decree of Shah Abbas I in the early seventeenth century. It was here that the great monarch used to entertain noble visitors, and foreign ambassadors.
Shah Abbas, here for the first time, celebrated the Nowruz (Iranian New Year) of 1006 AH / 1597 C.E.

Ali Qapu is rich in naturalistic wall paintings by Reza Abbasi, the court painter of Shah Abbas I, and his pupils. There are floral, animal, and bird motifs in his works. The highly ornamented doors and windows of the palace have almost all been pillaged at times of social anarchy. Only one window on the third floor has escaped the ravages of time. Ali Qapu was repaired and restored substantially during the reign of Shah Sultan Hussein, the last Safavid ruler, but fell into a dreadful state of dilapidation again during the short reign of invading Afghans. Under the reign of Naser ad-Din Shah the Qajar (1848–96), the Safavid cornices and floral tiles above the portal were replaced by tiles bearing inscriptions.

Shah Abbas II was enthusiastic about the embellishment and perfection of Ali Qapu. His chief contribution was given to the magnificent hall, the constructors on the third floor. The 18 columns of the hall are covered with mirrors and its ceiling is decorated with great paintings.

The chancellery was stationed on the first floor. On the sixth, the royal reception and banquets were held. The largest rooms are found on this floor. The stucco decoration of the banquet hall abounds in motif of various vessels and cups. The sixth floor was popularly called the Music Hall. Here various ensembles performed music and sang songs.

From the upper galleries, the Safavid ruler watched Chowgan (polo), army maneuvers and horse-racing in the Naqsh-e Jahan square.

The palace is depicted on the reverse of the Iranian 20,000 rials banknote. The palace is also depicted on the reverse of the Iranian 20 rials 1953 banknote series.

Name and etymology 
The name of the structure is composed of two words. "Ālī" (عالٍ) means "superior", borrowed from Arabic, while "Qāpū" (𐰴𐰯𐰍) means "door", and was adopted from Old Turkic.

Cause of Denomination
The Ali Qapu has multiple connotations, but generally connotes entrance or supreme gate to the complex of palaces and public buildings of the Safavi Government.

Construction stages
Ali Qapu's building was founded in several stages, beginning from a building with a single gate, with entrance to the government building complex, and gradually developed, ending in the existing shape. The period of the development, with intervals, lasted approximately seventy years. 

First Stage:
The initial building acting as entrance to the complex was in cubical shape and in two stories, with dimensions measuring 20 x 19 meter and 13 meter high.

Second Stage:
Foundation of the upper hall, built on the entrance vestibule, with cubical shape, over the initial cubic shape structure with the same height in two visible stories.

Third Stage:
Foundation of the fifth story, the Music Amphitheater or the Music Hall, built on the lower hall, using the central room for sky light, and thus the vertical extension being emphasized.

Fourth Stage:
Foundation of the eastern verandah or pavilion advancing towards the square, supported by the tower shaped building. By foundation of this verandah, the entrance vestibule was extended along the main gate and passage to the market, perpendicular to the eastern flank of the building.

Fifth Stage:
Foundation of the wooden ceiling of the balcony, supported by 18 wooden columns, and contemporaneous with erection of the ceiling, an additional stairway of the southern flank was founded and was called the Kingly Stairway.

Sixth Stage:
During this stage, a water tower was built in the northern flank for provision of water for the copper pool of the columned balcony. Plaster decorations in reception story and the Music Hall.

The room on the sixth floor is also decorated with plaster-work, representing pots and vessels and one is famous as the music and sound room. It has cut out decorations around the room, which represent a considerable artistic feat. These cut out shapes were not placed there to act as cupboards; the stucco-work is most delicate and falls to pieces at the highest touch. So we conclude that it was placed in position in these rooms for ornament and decoration. The rooms were used for private parties and for the king's musicians, and these hollow places in the walls retained the echoes and produced the sounds of the singing and musical instruments clearly in all parts.

Decorations
The interior decorations of a mansion are considered its most interesting architectural features. From the entrance of Ali Qapu mansion to the highest part of the music hall, the building has been decorated with the art of Iranian artists. You can see traces of plaster works and beautiful paintings on each floor of the Ali Qapu mansion.

On the third floor of Ali Qapu Palace were beautiful wooden columns decorated with mirror work, and the porch ceiling was also decorated with wooden reliefs and artistic carvings. Behind the porch, the outstanding paintings on the walls enhance the beauty of the building. Today, there is no news of mirror work and many parts of the paintings have been destroyed.

There are also prominent paintings by the Safavid artist Reza Abbasi in the interior decorations. Some of these works have been seriously damaged, but these damages do not diminish their value.

The interior of Ali Qapu Palace features patterned carpets as another feature. Muqarnas decorations, a feature of Islamic historical buildings, are abundant in this palace.

Safavid kings were interested in painting and painting, and many of the works left in Ali Qapu Palace are among the most important historical works of art in Isfahan. In the Ali Qapu Palace wall paintings, the name of the artist and the date of registration are not mentioned, making expert identification difficult. Ali Qapo mansion features beautiful and miniature pictures of traditional Iranian art, as well as modern and western paintings. There are paintings by Reza Abbasi and similar styles on the first, second, fourth, and fifth floors, as well as modern paintings on the third and sixth floors. Paintings in the palace are protected by a stabilizing solution.

Gilding can also be seen on the walls, arches, and ceilings of Ali Qapu mansion. Following the placement of the porcelain layer on the desired parts, the part is plated with gold so that the grooves are filled with gold water, which makes the effect twice as beautiful.

It is mentioned in the inscriptions and writings left in the Ali Qapu mansion that parts of the building were restored during the reign of Shah Sultan Hossein. As a result of many damages, only words and stanzas of the poems can be read on the walls of the palace.

This historical building is decorated with paintings of flowers and plants, foliage, beasts and birds, and plasterwork in the form of cups and saucers embedded in the arches and walls. It was not intended to place cups and dishes in the stucco shapes in this part of the building because the type of this work is very delicate and will break with the slightest touch. Additionally to their decorative aspect, these forms reflect natural sounds and tones. The beautiful, diverse and extensive decorations of the Ali Qapo mansion have drawn artists from all over the world for many years.

See also
List of the historical structures in the Isfahan province
History of Persian domes
 Ali Qapu Gate, Qazvin

Bibliography
 M. Ferrante: ‘Dessins et observations préliminaires pour la restauration du palais de ‛Alī Qāpū’, Travaux de restauration de monuments historiques en Iran, ed. G. Zander (Rome, 1968), pp. 137–206
 E. Galdieri: Eṣfahān: ‛Alī Qāpū: An Architectural Survey (Rome, 1979)

References

Introducing Ali Qapu Palace in Isfahan, Iran

External links

Safavid Palaces
More Picture، Tishineh

Palaces in Iran
Safavid architecture
Buildings and structures in Isfahan
Houses completed in 1597
Tourist attractions in Isfahan
Historic house museums in Iran
Safavid court